Petr Sýkora (born November 19, 1976) is a Czech former professional ice hockey right winger who played in the National Hockey League (NHL) for the New Jersey Devils, Mighty Ducks of Anaheim, New York Rangers, Edmonton Oilers, Pittsburgh Penguins, and Minnesota Wild. He is a two-time Stanley Cup champion, having won with the Devils in 2000 and the Penguins in 2009. Sýkora played in six Stanley Cup Finals in his NHL career.

Playing career
Before being drafted, Sýkora spent several seasons in the Czechoslovak Extraliga and the International Hockey League (IHL). As a Cleveland Lumberjack, Sýkora became the youngest player ever to play in the IHL at 17 years and 71 days. He has also played for the IHL's Detroit Vipers.

In the 1995 NHL Entry Draft, Sýkora was drafted in the first round, 18th overall, by the New Jersey Devils. He began his NHL career in 1995–96 with New Jersey, posting 42 points in his rookie campaign, as well as being chosen as the NHL Rookie of the Month for December. His career took off in his fourth NHL season, recording a breakout 72 points, which still stands as the second highest total of his career. As part of the Devils' effective "A-line," with Patrik Eliáš and Jason Arnott, he helped lead the team to a Stanley Cup in 2000 against the Dallas Stars. However, in the sixth and deciding game in Dallas, Sýkora suffered an injury and ended up in the hospital. When the Devils won the game to win the Stanley Cup, Devils Head Coach Larry Robinson and linemate Patrik Eliáš wore Sýkora's jersey for him. The team also brought the trophy to Sýkora in the hospital. The next season, Sýkora and the Devils were only a game away from repeating as Stanley Cup champions, but lost in the seventh game to the Colorado Avalanche. That year, Sýkora recorded career highs with 35 goals, 46 assists and 81 points.

However, the next season, Sýkora's offensive production dropped to just 48 points, and the before the start of the 2002–03 season, he was traded to the Mighty Ducks of Anaheim for forward Jeff Friesen and defenceman Oleg Tverdovsky. In his first season with Anaheim, Sýkora appeared in his third Stanley Cup Final, but lost to his former Devils teammates. En route to the finals, he scored the game-winning, quintuple-overtime goal in the fourth-longest playoff game in NHL history in Game 1 of the Western Conference Semi-finals against the Dallas Stars.

While the 2004–05 NHL lockout was in effect, Sýkora played for Metallurg Magnitogorsk of the Russian Superleague (RSL), scoring 31 points in 45 games. As NHL play resumed in 2005–06, Sýkora requested to be traded from Anaheim and on January 9, 2006, the New York Rangers acquired Sýkora in exchange for young defenceman Maxim Kondratiev and the return of a fourth-round draft pick the Rangers had previously traded to Anaheim.

After completing the season with New York, it was announced on July 7, 2006, that Sýkora would not return to the Rangers, and he was subsequently signed to a one-year deal with the Edmonton Oilers. On a line with countryman Aleš Hemský, Sýkora maintained the previous few seasons' scoring output and managed 53 points.

In July 2007, Sýkora signed a two-year contract with the Pittsburgh Penguins as an unrestricted free agent. After initially playing with Sidney Crosby, Sýkora was later lined up with Evgeni Malkin after Crosby suffered an injury towards the end of the season. Benefiting from his high-caliber linemates, Sýkora enjoyed his best offensive season since 2000–01, tallying 63 points.

Reaching the 2008 Stanley Cup Finals against the Detroit Red Wings, Sýkora scored a triple-overtime goal on the powerplay in Game 5 after previously telling on-ice reporter Pierre McGuire he would score the game-winner. With the Penguins down 3–1 in the series, Sýkora's goal forced a Game 6. However, the Penguins could not stave off elimination for a second straight game and lost the Cup to Detroit. The series marked Sýkora's fourth time playing in a Stanley Cup Final.

The following season, on December 11, 2008, Sýkora scored his eighth, ninth and tenth goals of the season for his first career NHL hat-trick against the New York Islanders at Mellon Arena. Sýkora had previously recorded 38 career two-goal games in his career, the all-time NHL record for most two-goal games without a single hat-trick. Later that season, on April 7, 2009, Sýkora scored his 300th career NHL goal in a 6–4 victory against the Tampa Bay Lightning. In early May 2009, Sýkora began struggling with a shoulder injury. He finished his second season in Pittsburgh with 25 goals and 46 points over 76 games. Bolstering their lineup at the trade deadline, the Penguins acquired wingers Bill Guerin and Chris Kunitz, resulting in decreased ice time for Sýkora. During the 2009 playoffs, he was regularly made a healthy scratch. He played in seven of the Penguins' 24 post-season games as the team returned to the Stanley Cup Finals against the Red Wings for the second straight year. Sýkora made his first appearance of the series in Game 6, but injured his right foot blocking a shot six minutes into the contest. Sidelined for the deciding Game 7, he forced his swelled foot into a skate to join the Penguins on the ice for their post-game celebration after defeating the Red Wings 2–1. Although Sýkora won the trophy with the Devils in 2000, he was unable to lift the Stanley Cup after a hit sent him to the hospital the night of the victory.

In the off-season, Sýkora was not re-signed by the Penguins and he became an unrestricted free agent on July 1, 2009. Without an NHL contract, Sýkora accepted a tryout with the Minnesota Wild on September 14. Three days later, the Wild signed him to a one-year, $1.6 million contract on September 17. He suffered a concussion early in the 2009–10 season, however, and was sidelined for two months. Through 14 games, he had recorded just three points and was placed on waivers by the Wild on January 19, 2010. On January 28, the Wild announced that Sýkora had cleared unconditional waivers, officially making him an unrestricted free agent.

Without an NHL contract, Sýkora returned to Europe, signing with HC Plzeň to start the 2010–11 season. After recording 13 points (five goals and seven assists) over 13 games while playing on a line with Martin Straka and Jan Kovář, he signed a tryout contract with Dinamo Minsk of the Kontinental Hockey League (KHL) on November 11, 2010. Over 28 games in the KHL, he scored eight goals and 15 points.

On September 12, 2011, it was announced that Sýkora would attend the New Jersey Devils' training camp on a tryout, hoping to return to the team that drafted him into the NHL. On October 5, 2011, he signed a one-year contract with the Devils worth $650,000.

On March 2, 2012, Sýkora played in his 1,000th career NHL game.

International play

In 2002, Sýkora was selected to play for the Czech Republic in the Winter Olympics in Salt Lake City, where the team placed seventh. Two years later, Sýkora also represented the Czech Republic in the 2004 World Cup. Sýkora has also won three Men's World Ice Hockey Championships medals, one bronze (1998) and two gold medals (1999 and 2005).

Career statistics

Regular season and playoffs

International

See also
List of NHL players with 1000 games played

References

External links

1976 births
Albany River Rats players
Cleveland Lumberjacks players
Czech ice hockey right wingers
Detroit Vipers players
Edmonton Oilers players
Czech expatriate ice hockey players in Russia
HC Dinamo Minsk players
HC Plzeň players
Metallurg Magnitogorsk players
Living people
Mighty Ducks of Anaheim players
Minnesota Wild players
National Hockey League first-round draft picks
New Jersey Devils draft picks
New Jersey Devils players
New York Rangers players
Olympic ice hockey players of the Czech Republic
Sportspeople from Plzeň
Pittsburgh Penguins players
SC Bern players
Stanley Cup champions
Czech expatriate ice hockey players in the United States
Czech expatriate ice hockey players in Canada
Expatriate ice hockey players in Belarus
Czech expatriate ice hockey players in Switzerland
Czech expatriate sportspeople in Belarus